Bargain Day is a 1931 Our Gang short comedy film directed by Robert F. McGowan. It was the 106th Our Gang short that was released.

Plot
Jackie notices that the Gang's baseball equipment is missing and discovers Wheezer and Stymie were peddling it, along with other items, from door to door. Wheezer, Stymie, and Bologna arrive at a rich family's home and try to sell a bunch of junk to a little girl named Shirley. Stymie wanders off playing with a pet monkey and a toy lion, and sets off a burglar alarm.

Jackie, Chubby, Mary Ann, Farina, Dorothy, and Speck arrive at the house and Chubby gets locked in a steam cabinet. Police arrive to investigate and find the Gang there.

Notes
Bargain Day was whittled down to 10 minutes in length on the Little Rascals television prints beginning in 1971. Scenes involving Stymie wandering throughout the house were excised due to perceived racism toward African-Americans. The edited portions were mostly reinstated in 2001 on prints shown on AMC from 2001 to 2003.
Bargain Day was also the last appearance of Jackie Cooper, who loaned to Paramount Pictures to appear in the film Skippy.

Cast

The Gang
 Matthew Beard as Stymie/Pansy's speaking voice
 Norman Chaney as Chubby
 Jackie Cooper as Jackie
 Dorothy DeBorba as Dorothy
 Allen Hoskins as Farina
 Bobby Hutchins as Wheezer
 Mary Ann Jackson as Mary Ann
 Shirley Jean Rickert as Shirley
 Donald Haines as Speck
 Pete the Pup as himself

Additional cast
 Harry Bernard as Sales clerk
 Baldwin Cooke as Socks customer
 Otto Fries as Plainclothes policeman
 Douglas Greer as a kid
 Tiny Sandford as Police captain
 Mickey Daniels as Laugh-over for Pansy

See also
 Our Gang filmography

References

External links

1931 films
American black-and-white films
Films directed by Robert F. McGowan
Hal Roach Studios short films
1931 comedy films
Our Gang films
1931 short films
1930s American films